Stefanos Papoutsogiannopoulos (born 10 August 1994) is a Greek professional footballer who plays as a midfielder.

Career
Papoutsogiannopoulos began his career with the youth club of Panetolikos in 2012, after having previously played for Rodos and Diagoras. He signed his first professional contract with Panetolikos in June 2013. He made his first-team debut on 18 August 2013, playing against Panathinaikos in the 2013–14 Superleague Greece.

References

External links
Profile  at Panetolikos.gr

1994 births
Living people
Greek footballers
Panetolikos F.C. players
Association football midfielders
People from Rhodes
Sportspeople from the South Aegean